The Centaur is a novel by John Updike (1963).

The Centaur may also refer to:

 The Centaur, novel by Algernon Blackwood (1911)
 "The Centaur", short story by José Saramago (1978)